Esslemont may refer to:

Esslemont (surname)
Esslemont railway station, railway station in Esslemont, Aberdeenshire
Esslemont Castle, ruined tower house in Aberdeenshire, Scotland